"Smooth Criminal" is a song by the American singer Michael Jackson, released on November 14, 1988, as the seventh single from his seventh album, Bad (1987). It was written by Jackson and produced by Jackson and Quincy Jones. The lyrics address a woman who has been attacked in her apartment by a "smooth criminal". The refrain "Annie, are you OK?" was inspired by Resusci Anne, a dummy used in CPR training.

The music video for "Smooth Criminal", which premiered on MTV on October 13, 1988, is the centerpiece of the 1988 film Moonwalker. The 1930s setting and Jackson's white suit and fedora pay tribute to the Fred Astaire musical comedy film The Band Wagon. In the video, Jackson and the dancers perform an apparently physically impossible "anti-gravity lean".

"Smooth Criminal" reached number seven on the Billboard Hot 100, becoming the sixth top-10 single from Bad. It reached number two on the Billboard Hot Black Singles chart. It was certified double platinum by the Recording Industry Association of America (RIAA). The song reached number one in Belgium, Iceland, the Netherlands, and Spain.

Retrospective reviews have described it as one of Jackson's best songs. Rolling Stone wrote that it was "his best blend of R&B groove and rock edginess, and a turning point in his shift toward darker, harder-edged material". It has appeared on numerous greatest hits albums and was performed on all of Jackson's solo tours. "Smooth Criminal" was re-released in 2006 as a single as a part of Jackson's Visionary: The Video Singles boxset.

Composition
"Smooth Criminal" evolved from an earlier song written by Jackson, "Al Capone" (named after real life gangster Al Capone), released on the 2012 reissue Bad 25. It is in the key of A minor, and Jackson's vocal spans from G3 to C6. The lyrics describe a narrator who finds a bloodstained carpet and an unconscious body. The chorus refrain, "Annie, are you OK?", was inspired by Resusci Anne, a dummy used in cardiopulmonary resuscitation training. Trainees learn to say "Annie, are you OK?" while practicing resuscitation on the dummy.

Release
"Smooth Criminal" peaked at number seven on the Billboard Hot 100, becoming the sixth top 10 single from Bad. It is certified 2× platinum by the Recording Industry Association of America, and platinum by the British Phonographic Industry. The song reached number one in Belgium, Iceland, the Netherlands and Spain and the top 10 in Denmark, France, Germany, Ireland, Italy, Switzerland and the UK.

Music video
 Jackson asked Vincent Paterson to conceive a concept for the short film. Paterson listened to the unfinished song and came up with the concept of a 1930s gangster club. Vincent Paterson, who was a lead dancer in the music videos for "Beat It" and "Thriller", co-choreographed the "Smooth Criminal" video with Jackson and Jeffrey Daniel of the soul music group Shalamar. The video and Jackson's white suit and fedora pay tribute to the Fred Astaire musical comedy film The Band Wagon, particularly the "Girl Hunt Ballet" (itself inspired by the novels of Mickey Spillane) scene. The video, directed by Colin Chilvers, was shot between mid-February and April 1987 at Culver City, California, and in the backlot at Universal Studios Hollywood and premiered on MTV on the night of October 13, 1988.

In the video, Jackson and the other dancers perform a lean that appears physically impossible. The dancers lean forward 45 degrees with their backs straight and feet flat on the floor, and hold the pose before returning upright. The lean moves the body's center of mass further than it can support. The illusion was achieved using cables and a harness. In October 1993, Jackson's team patented a method of performing the lean in concert using specially designed shoes that hook into pegs that rise from the stage. Even with the shoes, the move requires good athletic core strength.

The video won Best Music Video at the 1989 Brit Awards and the Critic's Choice awarded Jackson the "Best Video" award and the People's Choice Awards for "Favorite Music Video" for that same year.

In 2019, American television personality Kim Kardashian bought Jackson's "Smooth Criminal" fedora, which still had his makeup on it, for her daughter North West.

The style of clothing as well as mannerisms Jackson portrayed were reused in the numerous adaptations of the video game Michael Jackson's Moonwalker. The song serves as the background music for the "Club 30s" stage, the nightclub seen in the music video, that appears in the game. The video is the centerpiece of the 1988 film Moonwalker.

Critical reception 
Jason Elias of AllMusic wrote that "Smooth Criminal" was "a gorgeous and exhilarating record ... [it] presents Michael Jackson at his most captivating and it never fails to impress". Rolling Stone named it the sixth best Jackson song, writing that it was "his best blend of R&B groove and rock edginess, and a turning point in his shift toward darker, harder-edged material." In a retrospective review of Bad, Newsweek wrote: "[Smooth Criminal] is a sleek, exhilarating action sequence of a song that's unlike anything else in Jackson's catalog ... an urgent and inspired highlight. Bad is at its best when it explores the darker, more paranoid side that began to consume Jackson's life in the late '80s, and this song captures that impulse." Entertainment Weekly wrote: "If there was one song on Bad that truly captured the sense of artistic freedom that Jackson felt after Thriller, it was this track ... This is pop music as suspense drama."

Track listings

 7-inch single
 "Smooth Criminal" (single mix) – 4:10
 "Smooth Criminal" (instrumental) – 4:10
			
 12-inch maxi and CD-maxi
 "Smooth Criminal" (extended dance mix) – 7:46
 "Smooth Criminal" (extended dance mix radio edit) – 5:20
 "Smooth Criminal" ("Annie" mix) – 5:35
 "Smooth Criminal" (dance mix – dub version) – 4:45
 "Smooth Criminal" (a cappella) – 4:12

 Visionary single
CD side:
 "Smooth Criminal" – 4:10
 "Smooth Criminal" (extended dance mix) – 7:45

DVD side:
 "Smooth Criminal" (music video (end credits version)) — 4:11

 Cassette single
 "Smooth Criminal"
 "Smooth Criminal" (instrumental)

 3-inch CD single
 "Smooth Criminal" (extended dance mix) – 7:46
 "Smooth Criminal" ("Annie" mix) – 5:35
 "Smooth Criminal" (dance mix – dub version) – 4:45

 Japanese 3-inch CD single
 "Smooth Criminal"
 "Smooth Criminal" (instrumental)

Personnel
Adapted from single liner notes and Michael Jackson website.

 Michael Jackson – vocals, clap, vocal arrangement, rhythm arrangement, production
 Quincy Jones – production
 Bill Bottrell – drums
 John Robinson – drums
 Bruce Swedien – drums, police announcement, recording
 David Williams – guitar
 Kim Hutchcroft – saxophone
 Larry Williams – saxophone
 Gary Grant – trumpet

 Jerry Hey – trumpet, horn arrangement
 Kevin Maloney – muted Steinway piano
 Christopher Currell – Synclavier
 Denny Jaeger – Synclavier effects 
 Michael Rubini – Synclavier effects 
 John Barnes – synthesizer
 Michael Boddicker – synthesizer
 Dr. Eric Chevlen – heartbeat recording
 John Barnes – rhythm arrangement

Charts

Weekly charts

Year-end charts

Certifications

Cover versions
The Croatian duo 2Cellos performed the song in a viral YouTube video. They later performed it in the Glee episode "Michael".

Neil Patrick Harris performed the song in the Michael Jackson tribute episode of Lip Sync Battle.

Alien Ant Farm version

In May 2001, American rock band Alien Ant Farm released a cover version of "Smooth Criminal" as the second single from their second studio album, Anthology (2001). According to lead singer Dryden Mitchell, the band would play a few riffs of the Jackson song while warming up before gigs and audience members would request them to play the entire song. This positive feedback encouraged them to record their own rendition of "Smooth Criminal" and include it on Anthology.

The cover became a number-one hit on the US Billboard Modern Rock Tracks chart and was also a number-one hit in Australia for eight weeks. In Europe, it reached number three in the United Kingdom and charted within the top 10 in ten other countries. Alien Ant Farm's 1999 album Greatest Hits includes a hidden track named "Slick Thief", which is an early version of "Smooth Criminal".

Music video
The music video was directed by Marc Klasfeld. It references various Jackson music videos, including the "Smooth Criminal" video itself.

Charts

Weekly charts

Year-end charts

Decade-end charts

Certifications

Release history

References

External links
 
 
 US Patent: Method and means for creating anti-gravity illusion

1987 songs
1988 singles
2001 singles
Michael Jackson songs
Alien Ant Farm songs
Music videos directed by Marc Klasfeld
Number-one singles in Australia
Number-one singles in Denmark
Number-one singles in Finland
Number-one singles in Iceland
Dutch Top 40 number-one singles
Number-one singles in the Netherlands
Number-one singles in Spain
Ultratop 50 Singles (Flanders) number-one singles
Songs written by Michael Jackson
Song recordings produced by Michael Jackson
Song recordings produced by Quincy Jones
Epic Records singles
DreamWorks Records singles
Songs about crime
Songs about criminals